The Basilica of Notre-Dame de Nice is a Roman Catholic basilica situated on the Avenue Jean Médecin in the centre of Nice, in France. It is built in the Neo-Gothic architectural tradition.

The basilica, built between 1864 and 1868, was designed by Louis Lenormand and is the largest church in Nice, but is not the cathedral of the city.

Inspired by Angers Cathedral, it is built in the Gothic style. Its construction was motivated by a desire to add French architecture to the city following the acquisition of the County of Nice by France from the Kingdom of Sardinia; at the time Gothic buildings were considered to be characteristically French. Its most prominent features are two square towers 65 m high, which dominate the east front together with a large rose window featuring scenes of the Assumption of Mary.

On 29 October 2020, three people were killed at the church in an act of Islamic terrorism. The suspect was identified as a 21 year old Tunisian illegal immigrant, who had reportedly shouted "Allahu Akbar" while holding a Quran.

Gallery

References

External links 

 Les concerts de Notre-Dame: Official website of the Mairie de Nice
 L'architecture à Nice entre 1850 et 1860, Michel Steve, Cahiers de la Méditerranée, vol. 74, Les crises dans l'histoire des Alpes-Maritimes, 2007

Roman Catholic churches in Nice
Basilica churches in France
Gothic Revival church buildings in France
Tourist attractions in Nice
Roman Catholic national shrines
Roman Catholic shrines in France